Innvik is a village in Stryn Municipality in Vestland county, Norway. The village is located on the southern shore of the Nordfjorden. Directly across the fjord from Innvik lies the village of Roset.

The village was the administrative centre of the old municipality of Innvik, which existed from 1838 until 1965. Innvik Church is located in the village.

Name
The name comes from the old Innvik farm, since Innvik Church is located there. The old name is identical with the word vík which means "inlet". Over time, the prefix inn- (meaning "inner") was added to distinguish the area from nearby Utvik (meaning "outer" Vik). The name Indviken or the more modern spelling Innvik has been in use since the 15th century.

References

Villages in Vestland
Stryn